Sagunbhadi is a village in Nuapada district, Odisha, India. The village is situated in the bank of river Udanti.

Demography
 census
Total population of sagubhadi is 2056
male-1003
female-1053
total sc population-423
( male-229 female-194 )
total st population-22 (male -13 female-09 )
total literacy-1596 (male -906 female -790 )
percentage of literacy-80%

Education 
There are many educational institute in the village, namely  
U.P.M.E school 
M.E school 
BELARANEE HIGH SCHOOL
KING STAR PUBLIC SCHOOL 
Kendriya vidyalaya 
TOLTIA junior college

Near Town 
Sagunbhadi is a small town in the bank of Udanti river near sinapali. 
The nearest towns are 
 Sinapali 2 km
 Brahmanpada 13Km
 Gandabahali 10Km
 Khariar 30 km
Bargaon, Odisha 40Km
 Nuapada 90 km
 Boden 25 km
  Dharma garh  45 km

Natural place
Udanti river 
Jharia (forest)

References

Cities and towns in Nuapada district